Harrow High School is a co-educational academy in the London Borough of Harrow and a specialist Sports College. It was previously called Gayton High School and Harrow County School for Boys. The school has a sixth form for post-16 studies part of the Harrow Sixth Form Collegiate. There was an independent school with the same name on a nearby site until the late 1980s.

History

The site was formerly the home of Harrow County School for Boys, a grammar school. In 1975, when the London Borough of Harrow adopted a comprehensive system of education, the school became known as Gayton High School: it remained an all-boys school.

Comprehensive
Gayton High School was the last school in Harrow to become comprehensive in September 1975. Later, in 1998, the school became coeducational and changed its name to Harrow High School, a specialist sports college.

The school has gained a number of national awards for the quality of its provision, including the Artsmark Gold award (2003), Sportsmark award (2002), Investors in People (1999) and Careers Education and Guidance award (1996).

Academy
On 1 August 2011, Harrow High School officially gained academy status.

Independent school
The name "Harrow High School" previously belonged to an independent school which, until its closure in the late 1980s, occupied a site across the road from the current school, on Gayton Road.

Old Gaytonians Association (OGA) 
The Old Gaytonians Association gained its first two members in October 1911 but the association was officially established on 27 September 1912. It was closed on 30 September 2016.

It was named after the school publication of the same name, this name was chosen because the school site was on 'Gayton Road'.

Notable Old Gaytonians

Harrow County School for Boys 

The following were educated at the then Harrow County School for Boys:

 Peter Ackroyd, Biblical scholar 
 Clive Anderson, comedy writer and broadcaster
 Kenneth Bagshawe, emeritus professor of medical oncology, Charing Cross Hospital
 John Boothman, air officer commanding-in-chief RAF Coastal Command 1953–1956, and outright winner of the Schneider Trophy in the Supermarine S6B, 1931
 Donald Box, Conservative MP for Cardiff North 1959–66
 Sydney Caine, director, London School of Economics 1957–1967
 Horace Cutler, leader Greater London Council 1977–1981
 Nicholas de Lange, professor of Hebrew and Jewish studies, University of Cambridge
 Robert Dell, Archdeacon of Derby 1973-1992
 Kel Fidler, vice-chancellor of University of Northumbria 2001–2008, and chairman of the Engineering Council 2005–2011
 Andrew Findon, flautist
 C. Robin Ganellin, emeritus professor of medicinal chemistry, University College London
 Roger Glover, musician
 Carl Jackson, director of music at the Chapel Royal, Hampton Court
 Paul Jenkins, formerly HM Procurator General, Treasury Solicitor and head of the Government Legal Service
 Robin Leach, actor & broadcaster
 Leigh Lewis, former permanent secretary, Department for Work and Pensions
 Donald McMorran, architect
 Roger Mercer, archaeologist, and president, Society of Antiquaries of Scotland 2005–2008
 Beric Morley, former teacher at the school
 Derek Morris, former chairman of the Competition Commission; provost, Oriel College, Oxford
 Simon Napier-Bell, music manager and record producer
 Stephen Norrington, film director, Blade and The League of Extraordinary Gentlemen
 Paul Nurse, 2001 Nobel Prize in Physiology or Medicine; president, Royal Society 2010–2015
 Paul Oliver, architectural historian and writer on the blues and other forms of African-American music.
 Geoffrey Perkins, writer, and former head of comedy, BBC Television
 Geoffrey Pinnington, editor of The People 1972–82
 Michael Portillo, journalist and broadcaster, former Conservative politician and Cabinet Minister
 Alan Reece owner director, Pearson Engineering Ltd
 Andrew Ritchie, commandant, Royal Military Academy Sandhurst 2003–2006
 Cardew Robinson, comic
 Nigel Sheinwald, British ambassador to the United States 2007–2012
 Anthony Smith, director, British Film Institute 1979–1988; president, Magdalen College, Oxford 1988–2005.
 Stephen South, Formula Three driver
 Jamie Stewart, musician, The Cult
 Martin Walker, editor-in-chief emeritus, UPI
 Martin Townsend, journalist and former editor of the Sunday Express
 Anthony Young, Baron Young of Norwood Green, former deputy general secretary, Communication Workers Union; former governor, BBC; formerly Parliamentary Under Secretary of State for Postal Affairs and Employment Relations, Department for Business, Innovation and Skills

Gayton High School
 Angus Fraser, cricketer
 Mark Ramprakash, cricketer
Jitesh Gadhia, investment banker
 Rishi Rich, International Music producer
 Nick Webster, soccer coach, writer, TV personality

Harrow High School
 Marvin Sordell, footballer for Bolton Wanderers and England Under-21s
 Ben Davis, footballer for Fulham F.C. and Thailand under-23s

Bibliography
 May, Trevor. "The History of the Harrow County School for Boys". Harrow: Harrow County School for Boys, 1975 , 199p.
 "Golden Jubilee Book, 1911–1961". Farnham Common: R. G. Baker & Co., 1961, 124p.
 "The Gaytonian: The magazine of the County School, Harrow". 1911–1975.

References

External links
 Edubase
 Virtual Gaytonian

Academies in the London Borough of Harrow
Educational institutions established in 1911

Secondary schools in the London Borough of Harrow
1911 establishments in England